"Pancho and Lefty", originally "Poncho and Lefty", is a song written by American country music singer-songwriter Townes Van Zandt. Often considered his "most enduring and well-known song", Van Zandt first recorded it for his 1972 album The Late Great Townes Van Zandt. The song has been recorded by several artists since its composition and performance by Van Zandt, with the Willie Nelson and Merle Haggard version selling the most copies and reaching number one on the Billboard country chart.

Content and composition
The song is composed as a ballad of four stanzas which use the two-verse refrain: "All the Federales say they could've had him any day/ They only let him slip away out of kindness I suppose." The first two stanzas are sung back-to-back with the refrain being sung only after the second stanza. The verses of the first stanza introduce Lefty as a restless young soul who leaves home and his loving mother to seek his fortune south of the border. The verses of the second stanza introduce Pancho as a Mexican bandit, who "wore his gun outside his pants for all the honest world to feel". After the refrain, the third stanza tells of Pancho's eventual death in "the deserts down in Mexico" and implies that he was betrayed by his associate Lefty who was paid off by the Mexican federales. Lefty uses the money to reach Ohio, trying to return to friends and family who apparently have moved on. Lefty grows old in cheap hotels without his friend from Mexico. Following the refrain, the fourth stanza poetizes Pancho's life and appears to evoke sympathy for Lefty's attempted homecoming. A final extended refrain extends the two verse refrain to three.

Although the lyrics are not exactly reconcilable with the historic details of the life and death of the famous Mexican revolutionary Pancho Villa, Van Zandt does not rule out the idea. In an interview, he recalled, "I realize that I wrote it, but it's hard to take credit for the writing, because it came from out of the blue. It came through me and it's a real nice song, and I think, I've finally found out what it's about. I've always wondered what it's about. I kinda always knew it wasn't about Pancho Villa, and then somebody told me that Pancho Villa had a buddy whose name in Spanish meant 'Lefty.'  But in the song, my song, Pancho gets hung. 'They only let him hang around out of kindness I suppose' and the real Pancho Villa was assassinated."

Like much of Van Zandt's output, the song went largely unnoticed at the time of its release in 1972.  Neither it nor its parent album made any music charts.  In 1977, Emmylou Harris covered the song on her critically acclaimed number one album Luxury Liner.  Harris says she feels it is "her song", and it was this recording of the song that Willie Nelson first heard.

Willie Nelson and Merle Haggard took the song to number one on the country charts in July 1983 on their duet album Pancho & Lefty.  In the biopic Be Here To Love Me, Nelson states that when he asked Van Zandt what the song was about Van Zandt replied that he didn't know.  Nelson also recalls how his album with Haggard was nearly completed but he felt they didn't have "that blockbuster, you know, that one big song for a good single and a video, and my daughter Lana suggested that we listen to "Pancho and Lefty".  I had never heard it and Merle had never heard it."  Lana Nelson returned with a copy of the song and Nelson cut it immediately with his band in the middle of the night but had to retrieve a sleeping Haggard, who had retired to his bus hours earlier, to record his vocal part.

The vocals were recorded in one take that night.  The next day, Haggard wanted to rerecord his part, but Nelson told him the song had already been sent to New York.  Haggard later stated that the song was the only he had ever recorded before "he really knew it".

Van Zandt appears in the video for the song, playing one of the Mexican federales.  "It was real nice they invited me," Van Zandt told Aretha Sills in 1994.  "They didn't have to invite me and I made I think $100 dollars a day.  I was the captain of the federales.  And plus I got to ride a horse.  I always like that.  It took four and a half days and that video was four and a half minutes long...The money goes by a strange life, or elsewhere.  I mean it doesn't come to me.  But money's not the question.  I would like if I could write a song that would somehow turn one five-year-old girl around to do right.  Then I've done good. That's what I care about."

The royalties would provide Van Zandt with some badly needed income, though by all accounts he remained impervious to the song's success.  One story involving the song that Van Zandt loved to tell was when he got pulled over for speeding in Berkshire, Texas by two policeman, the first a blue-eyed Aryan type with a crew cut, and his partner a bronze, dark eyed Mexican.  Although his driver's license was up-to-date, the inspection sticker had expired, and the bedraggled singer found himself in the back of the police cruiser.  As Van Zandt recounted on Austin Pickers, "We got stopped by these two policeman and...they said 'What do you do for a living?', and I said, 'Well, I'm a songwriter,' and they both kind of looked around like "pitiful, pitiful," and so on to that I added, 'I wrote that song Pancho and Lefty. You ever heard that song Pancho and Lefty?  I wrote that', and they looked back around and they looked at each other and started grinning..."  The policemen explained that their police-radio code names were Pancho and Lefty and they let Van Zandt off with a warning.

The song is probably Van Zandt's most recognizable and has become a staple for aspiring folksingers and country bar bands alike.  Steve Earle told John Kruth in 2004, "You won't find a song that's better written, that says more or impresses songwriters more."  In the film Be Here To Love Me, Kris Kristofferson recites the opening lines of the song – Livin' on the road my friend was supposed to keep you free and clean, now you wear your skin like iron and your breath's as hard as kerosene – and then marvels, "And I could think, 'That was me!'"

Bob Dylan, whose album The Times They Are A-Changin''' had a major impact on Van Zandt, performed the song as a duet on television with Willie Nelson at Nelson's 60th birthday concert in 1993, which Andy Greene of Rolling Stone remembers as "the highlight of the night".

Video release
A music video was released for the song in 1983, depicting Willie Nelson as Pancho, and Merle Haggard as Lefty. Townes Van Zandt also appears in a supporting role. Nelson's daughter Lana (who incidentally was the one that suggested the recording of the duet) directed the video, the first for Nelson and second for Haggard, the first being for "Are the Good Times Really Over?" a year prior (albeit as mostly a performance video).

 Reception 

The song reached No. 1 on Billboards Hot Country Songs chart dated July 23, 1983.  The Willie Nelson release has sold 648,000 digital copies in the United States as of October 2019 since becoming available for download.

Legacy
"Pancho and Lefty" was covered by Merle Haggard and Willie Nelson; it was the title track of their duet album Pancho & Lefty, and a number one country hit that entered the Grammy Hall of Fame in 2020.

Members of the Western Writers of America chose it as the 17th-greatest Western song of all time.

In June 2004, Rolling Stone'' ranked "Pancho and Lefty" 41st on its list of the "100 Greatest Country Songs of All Time".

In 2021, the original version was listed at #498 on Rolling Stone's 500 Greatest Songs of All Time.

Willie Nelson and Merle Haggard

Weekly charts

Year-end charts

Notes

References

External links
 Chords and lyrics from the Townes Van Zandt Blue Sky Homepage
 [ Song review] at Allmusic

1972 songs
1983 singles
2013 singles
Townes Van Zandt songs
Merle Haggard songs
Willie Nelson songs
George Canyon songs
Male–female vocal duets
Songs written by Townes Van Zandt
Song recordings produced by Chips Moman
Songs about Mexico
Epic Records singles
Universal Music Canada singles